Uroš Mirković (born 11 January 1982) is a Serbian professional basketball player for Proleter Naftagas of the Basketball League of Serbia.

Professional career 
Mirković made his professional debut with the Mašinac during the 2000–01 season. There he played till April 2008. He signed for the remainder of the 2007–08 season for Vojvodina Srbijagas. Mirković signed back for the 2008–09 season for Masinac. He got the Serbian First League MVP award. In April 2009, he signed for the remainder of the 2008–09 season for Swisslion Vršac.

Mirković moved to Poland for the 2009–10 season where he signed for Polpharma Starogard Gdański. Prior to the 2010–11 season he signed for the Serbian team Crvena zvezda. In November 2010, he moved back to the Polpharma Starogard Gdański.

Mirković  played for Zastal Zielona Góra during the 2011–12 season, and for Polpharma Starogard Gdański during the 2012–13 season. In 2013, he briefly played for Serbian team Sloga. On 6 November 2013 he signed with Bosnian team Igokea.

On 6 July 2014 Mirković signed with Rosa Radom. On 25 November 2015 he signed with Polpharma Starogard Gdański for the fourth time. On 12 August 2017 he signed with TBV Start Lublin.

References

External links 
 Player Profile at realgm.com
 Player Profile at eurobasket.com
 Player Profile at Polish Basketball League
 Player Profile at beoexcell.net
 Player Profile at basketball-reference.com

1982 births
Living people
ABA League players
Basketball League of Serbia players
Basket Zielona Góra players
KK Crvena zvezda players
KK Igokea players
KK Mašinac players
KK Lions/Swisslion Vršac players
KK Sloga players
KK Vojvodina Srbijagas players
Power forwards (basketball)
Rosa Radom players
Serbian expatriate basketball people in Bosnia and Herzegovina
Serbian expatriate basketball people in Poland
Serbian men's basketball players
Start Lublin players
Sportspeople from Pristina